Senator Greene may refer to:

Members of the United States Senate
Albert C. Greene (1792–1863), U.S. Senator from Rhode Island from 1845 to 1851
Ray Greene (politician) (1765–1849), U.S. Senator from Rhode Island from 1797 to 1801
Frank L. Greene (1870–1930), U.S. Senator from Vermont from 1923 to 1930

United States state senate members
Bill Greene (1930–2002), California State Senate
Leroy F. Greene (1918–2002), California State Senate
Thomas Greene (Iowa politician) (born 1949), Iowa State Senate
Tom Greene (Louisiana politician) (born 1948), Louisiana State Senate
Walter S. Greene (1834–1891), Wisconsin State Senate

See also
Senator Green (disambiguation)